This is a list of women writers who were born in Tunisia or whose writings are closely associated with that country.

A
Ines Abassi (born 1982), poet, journalist
Faouzia Aloui (born 1958), poet, novelist
Hind Azouz (1926–2015), short story writer, essayist

B
Hélé Béji (born 1948), novelist, essayist
Souhayr Belhassen (born 1943), journalist, women's rights activist
Essma Ben Hamida (born 1951), journalist, entrepreneur
Néjia Ben Mabrouk (born 1949), screenwriter
Lina Ben Mhenni (1983–2020), linguist, activist, writer and blogger
Sihem Bensedrine (born 1950), journalist, human rights activist
Sophie Bessis (born 1947), Tunisian-born French historian and feminist
Noura Borsali (1953–2017), journalist, writer and feminist
Messaouda Boubaker (born 1954), novelist, short story writer
Dorra Bouzid (born 1933), journalist, art critic and feminist

C
Aïcha Chaibi, novelist
Amira Charfeddine (fl. 2019), novelist
Djemâa Chraïti (born 1960), writer 
Rachida el-Charni (born 1967), short story writer and novelist
Mounira M. Charrad (born 1942), Franco-Tunisian sociologist active in the United States

E
Fadela Echebbi (born 1946), poet
Sophie el Goulli (1931–2015), poet, novelist, historian

F 

 Faten Fazaâ, novelist

G
Sophie el Goulli (1932–2015), writer and art historian
Nidhal Guiga (born 1975), actress, playwright, screen writer and film director

H
Gisèle Halimi (1927–2020), feminist writer, lawyer
Fethia Hechmi (born 1955), poet and novelist

K
Sabiha Khemir (born 1959), novelist, non-fiction writer, illustrator, artist

L 
Meherzia Labidi Maïza (1963–2021), politician, translator and writer
Latifa Lakhdar (born 1956), historian and politician
 Dalenda Larguèche (born 1953), historian and women's rights activist

M

Lamia Makaddam (born 1971), poet, journalist and translator
Boutheina Jabnoun Marai, contemporary journalist, magazine publisher 
Samar Samir Mezghanni (born 1988), Arabic-language children's writer
Emna Mizouni (fl. since 2013), journalist, communications expert, Wikimedian of the Year 2019
Amel Mokhtar (born 1964), journalist and novelist
Amel Moussa (fl. 1990s), poet

P
Perpetua (died 203), writer of a prison diary from Carthage, The Passion of Perpetua and Felicity

R
Naziha Réjiba, journalist, founded the online journal Kalima in 2000

S
Amina Said (born 1953), French-language poet, short story writer, essayist

T
Alia Tabaï (born 1961), novelist
Najiya Thamir (1926–1988), essayist, short story writer, playwright, novelist, women's rights activist

Z
Fawzia Zouari (born 1955), writer and journalist

See also
List of women writers
List of Tunisian writers

References

-
Tunisian
Writers
Writers, women